Hosea 3 is the third chapter of the Book of Hosea in the Hebrew Bible or the Old Testament of the Christian Bible. This book contains the prophecies attributed to the prophet Hosea son of Beeri and this chapter is about the symbol of Israel's condition in their present dispersion, subsequent to their return from Babylon. It is a part of the Book of the Twelve Minor Prophets.

Text 
The original text was written in Hebrew language. This chapter is divided into 5 verses.

Textual witnesses
Some early manuscripts containing the text of this chapter in Hebrew are of the Masoretic Text tradition, which includes the Codex Cairensis (895), the Petersburg Codex of the Prophets (916), Aleppo Codex (10th century), Codex Leningradensis (1008). Fragments containing parts of this chapter in Hebrew were found among the Dead Sea Scrolls, including 4Q78 (4QXIIc; 75–50 BCE) with extant verses 2–4; and 4Q82 (4QXIIg; 25 BCE) with extant verses 1–5.

There is also a translation into Koine Greek known as the Septuagint, made in the last few centuries BCE. Extant ancient manuscripts of the Septuagint version include Codex Vaticanus (B; B; 4th century), Codex Alexandrinus (A; A; 5th century) and Codex Marchalianus (Q; Q; 6th century).

Verse 1
Then the Lord said to me,
"Go, again, love a woman who is loved by a lover and is committing adultery,
just as the Lord loves the children of Israel, who look to other gods and love raisin cakes."
 "A woman": presumed to be Gomer, who apparently (from this verse) had left Hosea, and was at that time living in adultery with another man ("a lover"). Unlike in Hosea 1:2 ("take a wife"), here Hosea it told to "love" her, that is, to 'renew his conjugal kindness to her'.
The statement in the last part of this verse reflects the words of two verses in the Book of Deuteronomy:
 Deuteronomy 7:8: "Because the Lord loved you" (cf. ) 
 Deuteronomy 31:18, "They are turned to other gods."
 "Raisin cakes" (KJV: flagons of wine): that is, "cakes of grapes" or "dried raisins"; these cakes were used in idolatry.

Verse 2
 So I bought her for fifteen shekels of silver and a homer and a lethech of barley
Acts 28:30), as well as can be fitting for a harlot. It also has the connotation of "digging", so the Vulgate Latin version renders it "I dug her", which may refer to the "digging" or "boring" the ears of a slave that chose to continue with his master (Exodus 21:6).
"Fifteen shekels of silver": was half the price of a slave (Exodus 21:32), or may allude to the dowry for a bride (1 Samuel 18:25). A shekel was about 0.4 ounce or 11 grams.
"A homer" of barley: was about 6 bushels or 220 liters or ten ephahs.
"A lethech" of barley: was "half homer", about 3 bushels or 110 liters or five ephahs, so in total: "one and a half homer" would equal "fifteen ephahs".

Verse 3
 Then I said to her, “You will remain with me many days. You will not play the whore, and you will not belong to another man. And also I will be with you."
 "You will remain with me many days": Literally, "you will sit," solitary like widow (Deuteronomy 21:13), not going after others, as before, but waiting only for him (Exodus 24:14; Jeremiah 3:2), for an undefined, long period, until he comes and takes her to himself.

Verse 4
 For the children of Israel shall abide many days
 without a king, and without a prince,
 and without a sacrifice, and without an image,
 and without an ephod, and without teraphim:
 "Ephod": generally refers to a linen garment wore by Israelite high priests according to Torah, and was equipped with Urim and Thummim; it was missing since the destruction of the second temple, so the people of Israel have been long without it and without the means of inquiry of God about future (cf. Ezra 2:63). Lacking the temple and the ephod, the whole Israelite priesthood now ceased in a proper sense, that the Septuagint renders with a phrase, "without a priesthood".

Verse 5
  Afterward shall the children of Israel return,
 and seek the Lord their God, and David their king;
 and shall fear the Lord
 and his goodness in the latter days.
 "David their King": This cannot refer to David himself, because he was long dead, so it must be referring to "the Son of David," of whom God says, "I will set up One Shepherd over them, and He shall feed them, even My servant David, and He shall be their Shepherd, and I the Lord will be their God, and My servant David a Prince among them" (Ezekiel 34:23-24), who would be a "witness, leader, commander to the people (Isaiah 55:4); someone who was to be "raised up to David (Jeremiah 23:5-6), a righteous Branch," and who was to "be called the Lord our Righteousness; David's Lord" (Psalm 110:1), as well as "David's Son." The verse can be paraphrased as: "Afterward the children of Israel shall repent, or turn by repentance, and shall seek the service of the Lord their God, and shall obey Messiah the Son of David, their King".

See also

Related Bible parts: Psalm 110, Jeremiah 23, Hosea 1, Hosea 2

Notes

References

Sources

External links

Jewish
Hosea 3 Hebrew with Parallel English
Hosea 3 Hebrew with Rashi's Commentary

Christian
Hosea 3 English Translation with Parallel Latin Vulgate

03